Abdali may refer to:

 An alternate name for the Durrani, one of the largest Pashtun tribes of Afghanistan and western Pakistan
 Ahmed Shah Durrani, also known as Ahmad Shah Abdali, founder of the Durrani Empire in Afghanistan
 Al-Abdali, a district in Amman, Jordan
 Abdali Mall, Amman, Jordan
 Abdali Project, in Al-Abdali
 Abdali Road, Multan, Pakistan
 Abdali Sultanate, also known as Lahej Sultanate, a historical state in the British Aden Protectorate and the Federation of South Arabia
 Abdali-I, a Pakistani short-range ballistic missile
 Sarah Mohanna Al Abdali (born 1989), Saudi Arabian artist
 Shaida Mohammad Abdali, Afghan ambassador to India
 Al Abdali, a region in Amman, Jordan. 
 Hasan Abdali, a village in Mojezat Rural District, Zanjan County, Zanjan Province, Iran
Zeeshan Haider Abdali

See also
 Abdal